Giovanni Ricci may refer to:

 Giovanni Ricci (American football)
 Giovanni Ricci (bishop) (1498–1574), Italian Roman Catholic bishop and cardinal
 Giovanni Ricci (mathematician) (1904–1973), Italian mathematician
 Giovanni Battista Ricci (c. 1537–1627), Italian painter